The Ministry of industries is a ministry in Government of Maharashtra. Ministry is responsible for promotion of industries in Maharashtra. 

The Ministry is headed by a cabinet level minister. Uday Samant is current Minister of Industries since 14 August 2022.

Head office

List of Cabinet Ministers

List of Ministers of State

List of Principal Secretary

Overview
Ministry of Industries is one of the main ministries in the Maharashtra Government. Mumbai is the state capital of Maharashtra. Mumbai is also the financial, commercial, and the entertainment capital of India. It is also one of the world's top ten centres of commerce in terms of global financial flow, generating 6.16% of India's GDP, and accounting for 25% of industrial output, 70% of maritime trade in India (Mumbai Port Trust and JNPT), and 70% of capital transactions to India's economy. The Maharashtra state houses important financial institutions and the corporate headquarters of numerous Indian companies and multinational corporations.

Departments
Directorate of Industries is an executive arm of the Ministry and is responsible for implementation of government policies for development of industries in Maharashtra.

References

External links

Government of Maharashtra
Government ministries of Maharashtra
Maharashtra
State industries departments of India